Indiana Jones: The Pinball Adventure is a 1993 widebody pinball game designed by Mark Ritchie (the younger brother of acclaimed pinball designer Steve Ritchie) and released by Williams. It was based on the Indiana Jones movies. It was also part of WMS' SuperPin series of widebody games (see also The Twilight Zone and Star Trek: The Next Generation).

This game was the first game to use Williams / Midway's DCS Sound System. It features sound clips from the first three films, and actor John Rhys-Davies (reprising his role as Sallah) provided new speech for the game.

Another machine, simply titled Indiana Jones, was released in 2008 by Stern Pinball. It includes elements from the fourth film, Indiana Jones and the Kingdom of the Crystal Skull.

Notable features
 Path of Adventure: a long-shaped mini-playfield on which a roll-down game is played.  The player has to steer the ball by tilting the mini-playfield left and right with the flipper buttons.

Modes
There are a total of 12 "modes" in Indiana Jones, each of them based on a scene from any of the three movies. Unlike The Twilight Zone, the modes aren't stackable (i.e., finishing one mode before going on to the next).

Raiders of the Lost Ark
Get the Idol: The players have to get the idol by shooting the lock sinkhole.
Raven Bar / Get the Medallion (video mode): The players must kill 20 Nazis to collect the medallion, and get an extra ball (if max extra balls have been earned, a score award is given for each one earned thereafter); the mode ends if they get shot five times.
Streets of Cairo: Shoot the ramps and orbits to search for Marion under boxes (she's under the one the monkey is screeching on) - 10 million each if Marion is not underneath. Finding Marion alters the display to show Indy being menaced by a sword-wielding Arab type. Can be killed by two forms: shooting the Start Mode saucer (adds 20 million points), or pressing the trigger on the plunger (adds 2 million points). 
Well of Souls: This is a six-ball multiball where a shot to the lock hole is worth 2 million points, multiplied by the number of balls in play.
Indiana Jones and the Temple of Doom
Monkey Brains: Each loop and ramp shot is worth 8 million points.
Steal the Stones: The players have to get the stones by shooting the right ramp. Collecting the eight stones is worth 20 million points.
Escape in the Mine Cart (video mode): Move the mine cart left and right through the tunnels, steering for the open tunnels and avoiding the closed ones. A 30 million point bonus is added at the end of the mode.
Survive the Rope Bridge: Successive ramp shots will move him further along and score 10 million each. Four ramps are required to get him across, and a fifth to cut the rope and get an extra ball.
Indiana Jones and the Last Crusade
Castle Brunwald (misspelled as Grunewald): Shoot the drop target covering the captive ball, and then keep hitting the captive ball to escape the castle.
Tank Chase: Shoot the left and right loops to pursue the tank; getting the last shot allows Indy to destroy the tank for a 30 million point bonus.
Three Challenges: Shoot the right ramp for the Path to Adventure raised playfield. Challenges 1, 2, & 3 are completed by hitting all lit rollovers for 10 million, 20 million, and 30 million respectively. All lit rollovers have to be hit during one pass of the Path to collect the points.
Choose Wisely (video mode): Five grails will appear on the display, and after they are shuffled around, they have to choose the right grail. If they choose the right grail, the knight will say, "You have chosen wisely", and are awarded 20 million points. If choosing the wrong grail, an animation of the Nazi dying is seen, the knight will say, "You have chosen... poorly", and the players are awarded 5 million points.

Multiball
There are four multiball mode in Indiana Jones:
Regular Multiball (3-ball): The players must hit the three drop targets covering the lock hole, and then shoot the lock hole to lock the ball inside the rotating idol head (located on the middle right of the playfield). If they lock a ball without hitting the drop targets, Shorty will say, "You cheat, Dr. Jones!" and are awarded 5 million points. After three balls are locked, multiball starts. During multiball, various targets increase the base jackpot value (20 million for the Ark, 30 million for the Stones, and 40 million for the Grail), and they have to shoot either the left ramp or the lock hole to light the jackpot. After that, they must shoot the right ramp within 15 seconds to collect the jackpot. During the jackpot countdown, if they have two or three balls in play, they can shoot the second or third ball into the lock hole to double or triple the jackpot value. After collecting all three jackpots, the captive ball is lit for Super Jackpot (Base value: 80 million for the Ark, 90 million for the Stones, and 100 million for the Grail). Again, players shoot the left ramp to light the Super Jackpot, and then hit the captive ball to collect the Super Jackpot.
Quick Multiball (2-ball): The players have to hit the drop target (guarding the captive ball) on the upper right side of the playfield) twice, and within 15 seconds, to hit the captive ball to start Quick Multiball. Another ball is launched into play, and the goal is to keep hitting the captive ball for the following awards:
 The Idol of The Incas (10 million)
 The Diamond of Shanghai (15 million)
 The Remains of Nurhaci (20 million)
 The Cross of Coronado (25 million)
 The Fish of Tayles (30 million). This is a reference to Mark Ritchie's previous game, 1992's Fish Tales.
Well of Souls (6-ball)
Eternal Life (6-ball): Completing all 12 modes lights the "Start Mode" scoop for Eternal Life, a frenetic six-ball wizard mode. In this mode, all six balls are launched into play and the objective is to hit all the targets on the playfield (including the Path of Adventure mini-playfield and excluding the outlanes) with at least two balls in play to score a 1 Billion point bonus. At the start of Eternal Life, the "Eternal Life" ballsaver is active for a limited amount of time.

External links
 
Recent Auction Results for Indiana Jones: The Pinball Adventure
Indiana Jones: The Pinball Adventure Webseite (deutsch)
Indiana Jones: The Pinball Adventure Website
Indiana Jones: The Pinball Adventure promo video

Pinball Adventure
Williams pinball machines
Pinball machines based on films
Pinball Adventure
Pinball Adventure
Pinball Adventure
1993 pinball machines